Aggi may refer to:

 The Aggi Crew, an organized crime syndicate from Bristol, England
 Aggi-Bhagava, an Indian god
 The Aggi-Vacchagotta Sutta, a Buddhist sutta
 Throw Aggi Off the Bridge, a 1992 EP by Black Tambourine
 Agrostemma githago, the common corncockle plant, USDA code: AGGI
 Babanakira Airport, an airport in the Solomon Islands, ICAO code: AGGI

See also
 Agey, a commune in Côte-d'Or, Bourgogne, France
 AGG (disambiguation)
 Agge (disambiguation)
 Saint Aggei, Wycliffe's spelling of Mar Aggai, the second Bishop of Edessa, Mesopotamia
 Aggey (disambiguation)
 Aggie (disambiguation)
 Aggy (disambiguation)
 Agi (disambiguation)
 Agii (disambiguation)
 Agy, a commune in the Basse-Normandie région of France